Arthur J. Gregg is a retired United States Army officer who became a three star general. He served the US Army for over 30 years, receiving his third star in 1977 and retiring in 1981. In 2022, it was announced that Fort Lee in Petersburg, Virginia would be renamed after General Gregg and Charity Adams Earley.

Early life and education 
Gregg was born in Florence, South Carolina in May 1928. He attended grade school near Florence. There were no high schools open to Blacks closer than 10 miles to Gregg's home, so an older brother arranged for Gregg to stay with him in Newport News, Virginia to attend high school there.

After graduation from high school, Gregg briefly served in the US Merchant Marine and studied at the Chicago College of Medical Technology before enlisting in the US Army.

Military career 
General Gregg enlisted in the US Army in 1946; one of his areas of service as a noncommissioned officer was in logistics - specifically as a supply sergeant in Europe. He was accepted into Officer Candidate School in 1950, and subsequently served in Vietnam, other parts of Asia, and at Fort Lee, Virginia - a facility which would later be slated to be named for him. In 1977, Gregg was ultimately promoted to Lieutenant General, serving as deputy chief of staff of logistics. He retired from the Army in 1981.

Post-military career and honors 
An award named after Gregg, the General Gregg Award, was created by the US Army in 2016. General Gregg was the eponymous first recipient of the award.

In 2021 the US Army's naming commission announced the Fort Lee, Virginia, would be renamed Fort Gregg-Adams, honoring General Gregg and Charity Adams Earley.

References 

1928 births
Living people
African-American United States Army personnel
People from Florence, South Carolina
Military personnel from South Carolina
United States Army personnel of the Vietnam War
United States Army generals